Independence School may refer to:

Independence High School (disambiguation)
Baltimore Independence School, a public charter high school in Baltimore, Maryland
Independence Middle School (Jupiter, Florida)
Independence Middle School (Independence, Ohio)

See also
Independence Community College, Independence, Kansas